Ikenoue is a Japanese surname. Notable people with the surname include:

, Japanese footballer
, Japanese handball player

See also
Ikenoue Station, a railway station in Setagaya, Tokyo Japan

Japanese-language surnames